The following is a list of conventional lines of rail transport in Bangladesh.

History
The first railway line in Bangladesh was laid in 1862 by the British Raj. At that time Bangladesh didn't exist and its land was part of the Bengal Presidency. On 15 November of that year, Eastern Bengal Railway, the predecessor of Bangladesh Railway, opened the first railway line from Darshana railway station to Jagati railway station. In 1885 another railway line was built from Narayanganj to Mymensingh. In 1895, the railway line from Comilla to Chittagong was built. In 1914, a new railway was built from Akhaura to Tongi. After three years of construction, the railway line that connects Shayestaganj to Habiganj was opened in 1915. Another section from Shayestaganj to Balla was opened in 1929. Before the partition of India, many railway lines were built in Eastern Bengal, such as Chittagong–Dohazari, regional lines in Mymensingh region and others. 

After 1947, East Bengal got 2606.59 km railway. Until Bangladesh became independent in 1971the railways were operated by Pakistan Eastern Railway. After independence this was taken over by Bangladesh Railway.

Bangladesh Railway

East Zone
 Chittagong Circular Railway
 Akhaura–Kulaura–Chhatak line
 Akhaura–Laksam–Chittagong line
 Habiganj Bazar–Shaistaganj–Balla line
 Kulaura–Shahbajpur line
 Narayanganj–Bahadurabad Ghat line
 Tongi–Bhairab–Akhaura line

West Zone
 Rajbari–Bhanga line
 Chilahati–Parbatipur–Santahar–Darshana line
 Darshana-Jessore-Khulna Line
 Iswardi–Sirajganj line
 Joydebpur–Bangabandhu Shetu East line
 Jessore–Jhenidah Light Railway
 Khulna–Bagerhat Railway
 Burimari–Lalmonirhat–Parbatipur line
 Chilahati–Parbatipur–Santahar–Darshana line
 Old Malda–Abdulpur line
 Iswardi–Sirajganj line
 Santahar–Kaunia line

Mass Rapid Transit
 MRT Line 1
 MRT Line 2
 MRT Line 3
 MRT Line 4
 MRT Line 5
 MRT Line 6

Cross-border lines
 Benapole–Petrapole
 Darshana–Gede
 Rohanpur–Singhabad
 Biral–Radhikapur
 Chilahati–Halibari
 Akhaura–Agartala

Proposed
 Dhaka–Jessore line
 Bhanga–Kuakata line
 Chittagong–Cox's Bazar line
 Tongi–Manikganj–Paturia Ghat line
 Khulna–Mongla Port line
 Fatehabad–Kaptai line

References

Bangladesh
Railway lines in Bangladesh
line